Cheah Pou Hian is a politician from DAP. He has been the Member of the Perak State Legislative Assembly for Jelapang since 2018. He has a Diploma in Electronic Engineering in Linton University College and Electrical Engineering studies in City and Guilds of London Institute.

Election results

References 

Malaysian politicians of Chinese descent
Democratic Action Party (Malaysia) politicians
Living people
Members of the Perak State Legislative Assembly
Year of birth missing (living people)